Sir Patrick Shaw  (18 September 191327 December 1975) was an Australian public servant and diplomat.

Shaw joined the Department of External Affairs in 1939. He worked in the Department's political section until 1941 when he was sent on his first overseas posting as third secretary in Australia's Tokyo legation. Shaw and other legation staff were taken as prisoners of war when war broke out.

In 1973, Prime Minister Gough Whitlam announced Shaw's appointment as Ambassador to the United States. While in the role, Shaw suffered a fatal heart attack. He died on 27 December 1975. Ambassador Shaw's wife, Lady Shaw, was a victim of a street attack in Washington, D.C., for which she received ex gratia remuneration from the United States Government.

Shaw's daughter, Karina Campbell (née Shaw) followed her father in working in the Australian diplomatic service. Karina Campbell joined the then-Department of External Affairs in 1963 and later held a range of senior positions in the Department.

References

1913 births
1975 deaths
Australian Commanders of the Order of the British Empire
Australian Knights Bachelor
Ambassadors of Australia to Indonesia
Ambassadors of Australia to Japan
Ambassadors of Australia to Nepal
Ambassadors of Australia to the United States
High Commissioners of Australia to India
Permanent Representatives of Australia to the United Nations
Permanent Representatives of Australia to the United Nations Office in Geneva
Australian prisoners of war
Public servants from Melbourne
People from Kew, Victoria
University of Melbourne alumni